The Mount Royal National Park is a protected national park located in the Hunter region of New South Wales, Australia.

The park is part of the Barrington Tops group World Heritage Site Gondwana Rainforests of Australia inscribed in 1986 and added to the Australian National Heritage List in 2007.

During the 2019 Australian Bushfire Season, the park was damaged by the ‘Mount Royal 1’ fire.

Major Peaks 
Mount Royal is the highest peak at 1,186m.

Pieres Peak is a major peak south of Mount Royal at 986m.

Fauna 
The park is home to endangered animal species such as parma wallaby, rufous scrub bird, paradise riflebird, hastings river mouse and the glossy black-cockatoo.

The animals that live here do not seem to have evolved, today they look like their fossil remains.

See also
 Protected areas of New South Wales
 Mount Royal
 Mount Royal Range

References

National parks of the Hunter Region
Dungog Shire
Protected areas established in 1997
Gondwana Rainforests of Australia
1997 establishments in Australia